This Is Christmas may refer to:
 "So this is Christmas…", the opening line of "Happy Xmas (War Is Over)", a 1971 song by John & Yoko/Plastic Ono Band
 This Is Christmas (Luther Vandross album), 1995
 This Is Christmas (Katherine Jenkins album), 2012
 This Is Christmas (Anthony Callea album), 2013
 A song from It's Christmas All Over by Goo Goo Dolls, 2020
 This Is Christmas (film), British film directed by Chris Foggin

See also 
 This Christmas (disambiguation)